Daniel Butler (June 1, 1944 – August 23, 1970) was an American cyclist. He competed in the individual road race at the 1968 Summer Olympics.

References

External links
 

1944 births
1970 deaths
American male cyclists
Olympic cyclists of the United States
Cyclists at the 1968 Summer Olympics
Sportspeople from Oakland, California
Cyclists from California
20th-century American people